Kim Tae-Ho (born 22 September 1989) is a South Korean footballer who plays as full back and center back for East Coast Bays in the NRFL Championship.

Career
He was selected by Chunnam Dragons in the 2013 K League draft. He made his debut in the league match against Daegu FC on 10 March 2013.

References

External links 

1989 births
Living people
Association football fullbacks
South Korean footballers
Jeonnam Dragons players
FC Anyang players
K League 1 players
K League 2 players
South Korean expatriate sportspeople in New Zealand
South Korean expatriate footballers
Expatriate association footballers in New Zealand